The Radar Operations Center (ROC) is a National Weather Service (NWS) unit that coordinates the development, maintenance, and training for the NEXRAD weather radar network. It is located at the National Weather Center (NWC) in Norman, Oklahoma and run by the National Oceanic and Atmospheric Administration (NOAA) in the Department of Commerce with partners at the Department of Defense and the Department of Transportation.

ROC consists of four branches: Applications, Engineering, Operations, and Program. ROC also works with the Federal Aviation Administration's Terminal Doppler Weather Radar (TDWR) network.

See also
 Warning Decision Training Division (WDTD)
 National Weather Service Training Center (NWSTC)
 National Severe Storms Laboratory (NSSL)

References

External links
 Radar Operations Center (ROC)
 ROC Facebook, Twitter, Youtube
 Office of the Federal Coordinator for Meteorology (OFCM)
 NWS Change Management Section: NEXRAD
 NWS Engineering Management Reporting System (EMRS)

National Weather Service